Events from the year 1423 in Ireland.

Incumbent
Lord: Henry VI

Events
 Richard Talbot, Primate of Ireland appointed Lord Chancellor of Ireland

Deaths

References